Italians in Greece may refer to:

Corfiot Italians
Italian colonists in the Dodecanese

Greece
Ethnic groups in Greece